Arawala was a village in West Darfur province of the Darfur region of Sudan.
In its heyday it used to have a population of 7000 inhabitants; however, this changed after the village was attacked by Janjaweed militia.

Notes

Populated places in Central Darfur
Villages in Sudan